Public Bath House No. 3, also known as Yonkers Avenue Pool, is a historic public bath located on the border of the Getty Square and Nodine Hill neighborhoods in  Southwest Yonkers, Westchester County, New York. It was built in 1909 and is a two-story, five bay wide red brick building with lively tile ornamentation in the Second Renaissance Revival style.  It features a hipped tile parapet at the roofline that hides the flat roof.  The interior is in three sections: reception area, custodian's apartment, and a pool and showers.  It was remodeled in 1930 and 1958.

It was added to the National Register of Historic Places in 1985.

References

Renaissance Revival architecture in New York (state)
Buildings and structures completed in 1909
Buildings and structures in Yonkers, New York
National Register of Historic Places in Yonkers, New York
Public baths on the National Register of Historic Places in New York (state)
Public baths in the United States